Yuxi is a prefecture-level city in the central part of Yunnan province of the People's Republic of China. The administrative center of Yuxi is Hongta District.

Geography
Like much of the central and eastern parts of the province, it is part of the Yunnan-Guizhou Plateau.

Near Yuxi city is Fuxian Lake, the second-deepest freshwater lake in China, where there have been discovered ancient fossils that are now in the possession of the Yuxi museum. There also are three other lakes around the city. They are Xingyun Lake, Qilu Lake, Yangzong Lake.

Climate

Tempered by the low latitude and moderate elevation, Yuxi has a mild subtropical highland climate (Köppen Cwb), with short, mild, dry winters, and warm, rainy summers. A great majority of the year's rainfall occurs from June to October.

Transport 
China National Highway 213
G8511 Kunming–Mohan Expressway
Kunming–Yuxi–Hekou railway
Yuxi–Mohan railway

History

The city was founded in 960 AD, at a time when Yunnan was not yet part of China. Yuxi was once the core area of Yunnan Province during the Previous Qin Dynasty (period before 221 BC). In the Western Han Dynasty (206 BC-24 AD), it became a county of Yizhou Shire. The following dynasties witnessed the continuous separations and unifications of the area. It was not until 1997 that Yuxi became a prefecture-level city of the People's Republic of China.

Demography

31.76% (2003) of Yuxi population are non-Han ethnic minorities.

Government
Rao Nanhu is the mayor of Yuxi City.

People
The composer of China's National Anthem, Nie Er was from Yuxi.

Economy

Yuxi is the home of the Hongta Group, which was named after the Red Pagoda which sits atop a nearby hill.  The Pagoda was originally white, but was painted red during the cultural revolution.  The tobacco is of high quality because there are over 2300 hours of sunlight a year in the region, adequate rainfall in the summer, and excellent soil that produces a plethora of other fruits and vegetables.  The region has begun producing wine, which could prove to be quite palatable in the next decade or so. There are substantial mineral deposits of tin and phosphate ores, including the Heavenly Triangle of Huaning, Jiangchuan and Chengjiang.

Yuxi is one of the fastest growing small cities in China.  In 2001, the city won an Honor Award in Analysis & Planning by the American Society of Landscape Architects.  In 2004 UNIDO held a Workshop on Seed Treatment Technology, one of only two in China.

Education
Yuxi Normal University is a university located in Yuxi with almost 8000 students. It was founded in 1978 as Yuxi Normal College. In 2000, under the approval from the Ministry of Education of the People's Republic of China, it was renamed Yuxi Normal University, with the merging of Yuxi Adult Education Center and Yuxi Normal School.

Subdivisions

See also
Yunnan Institute of Development

References

External links
Yuxi City Official Website (en)
Yuxi Normal University
Hongta Group

 
960 establishments
10th-century establishments in China
Cities in Yunnan